14WE (original project names EN57/M and Halny, one unit also called EN61) is an electric multiple unit (EMU) produced by Newag in Nowy Sącz, Poland. They are essentially heavily reconstructed PKP class EN57 EMU, of early-1960s vintage, reusing only their underframes.

The trainset consists of driver car (type 410B), motor car (type 309B) and driver car (410B), with four passenger doors per car (two on each side). The 14WE is designed for suburban commuter traffic, with the carrying capacity of 192 seats and (nominally) 255 standing places.

The trainset has Scharfenberg couplers, which are standard on all Polish EMUs. This creates operational problems in cases of a breakdown.

References 

 This article is largely based on the corresponding Polish WP page 
 Technical data from the SKM website

External links 
 
 Manufacturer website 

Electric multiple units of Poland
3000 V DC multiple units